Nigel Roebuck (born 1946 in Manchester, Lancashire) is an English journalist. Since 1971 he has reported on Formula One, and is considered one of the sport's most influential writers. From 2007 to 2016 he was editor-in-chief of Motor Sport magazine.

Roebuck was educated at Giggleswick School in North Yorkshire, also the alma mater of Keith Duckworth, another well-known figure in Formula One. He wrote freelance articles for many publications as well as being Press Officer for the Embassy Hill F1 team in 1975. At the same time he was writing for Autosport magazine and became their Grand Prix correspondent in 1976.

Roebuck's weekly column, entitled ‘5th Column’ in deference to Emilio Mola Vidal, a Nationalist general in the Spanish Civil War, became a must-read for its insights into drivers, team managers and some of the self-important bureaucrats running F1 in the late 1970s and 1980s. While covering F1 (a category of racing that he loved more than any other) he became close to several drivers, notably Gilles Villeneuve, Chris Amon, Keke Rosberg, Mario Andretti, Eddie Cheever, Derek Warwick, Ayrton Senna and Alain Prost.

He is also a passionate collector of Roadster-era US oval racing literature.

Among Roebuck's freelance outlets were Autosport, plus Autoweek in the USA and a retrospective column in Motor Sport.

At the end of 2007 he stopped writing his weekly articles for Autosport magazine and website, to concentrate on his new position as editor-in-chief of Motor Sport magazine.

In 1982 Roebuck drove a Formula One Renault turbo at Circuit Paul Ricard in  France.

Roebuck was a commentator for the ESPN coverage of the 1988 Canadian Grand Prix.

In January 2017 Motor Sport magazine announced that Roebuck would no longer be writing for the magazine, returning to his 'spiritual home', Autosport magazine.  His column was one of the most popular in Motor Sport magazine and ran for over nine years.

References

External links
 Motor Sport Magazine
 Autosport.com

1946 births
Living people
British motoring journalists
People educated at Giggleswick School
Formula One journalists and reporters
English motorsport people
Journalists from Manchester